Piggy is the name of two animated cartoon characters in the Merrie Melodies series of films distributed by Warner Bros. The first character was a fat, black pig wearing a pair of shorts with two large buttons in the front, and his first film was You Don't Know What You're Doin'!

Piggy's name came from one of two brothers who were childhood classmates of Freleng's, nicknamed "Porky" and "Piggy".

Merrie Melodies
Animator Rudolf Ising introduced Piggy to replace his previous character, Foxy, as the star of the Merrie Melodies series Ising was directing for producer Leon Schlesinger. Nonetheless, Ising had only made two Piggy shorts in 1931 before he left Warner Bros. with partner Hugh Harman. The animators who took over the Merrie Melodies cartoons dropped the Piggy character (as well as his girlfriend Fluffy) and turned the series into a string of one-shots.

Piggy's coloration and dress were identical to those of the Walt Disney character Mickey Mouse before the advent of color film.  John Kenworthy argues that, considering the fact that some sketches of mice that Hugh Harman had drawn in 1925 were the inspiration for the creation of Mickey Mouse, Harman and Ising never intended to copy Disney.

Despite their clichéd lead character, Ising's two Piggy shorts are well received by some critics. In the first, You Don't Know What You're Doin'!, Piggy visits a surreal nightclub where he heckles and plays with the club's jazz band. Cartoon historians Jerry Beck and Will Friedwald call this "the definitive Harman-Ising Warner film: the characters are cute, the humor is gross, the visuals are uninhibited, and the music is red hot."

This was followed by Hittin' the Trail for Hallelujah Land, also in 1931. Here, Piggy plays a steamboat captain who must rescue a drowning Uncle Tom. Due to its stereotypical portrayal of the Uncle Tom character, the cartoon is included among the so-called "Censored 11", Looney Tunes and Merrie Melodies shorts that are withheld from circulation due to their heavy use of ethnic stereotypes. Piggy never starred in another cartoon, although he continued to appear at the end of every short up to 1932's You're Too Careless with Your Kisses!

In 1936, Animator Friz Freleng created another character named Piggy. This character was given lighter, more Caucasian-like color with distinguishing birthmarks. The redesigned character appeared as a gluttonous child in a large family of pigs in At Your Service Madame (which gives his full name as Piggy Hamhock), where he leads his fellow siblings in foiling a bum's attempt to rob their mother.  

A year later, the new Piggy starred in Pigs Is Pigs in which his gluttony takes center stage.  This is his final appearance. After this, he is discarded, with his character traits transferred for a time to Porky Pig.

References

Film characters introduced in 1931
Film characters introduced in 1936
Fictional pigs
 
Looney Tunes characters